The Republican Governance Group, originally the Tuesday Lunch Bunch and then the Tuesday Group until 2020, is a group of moderate Republicans in the United States House of Representatives. It was founded in 1994 in the wake of the Republican takeover of the House; the Republican House caucus came to be dominated by conservatives. It is considered a centrist or centre-right.

In 2007, the Tuesday Group founded its own political action committee.  The name of the PAC was "Tuesday Group Political Action Committee" but has since changed to "Republican Governance Group/Tuesday Group Political Action Committee".  It is based in Tampa, Florida.

Another major group of Republican moderates in Congress was the Republican Main Street Caucus, which existed briefly from 2017 to 2019.

Wednesday Group
Members of its predecessor, the Wednesday Group, first founded in the House between 1961 and 1963 and then in the Senate around 1969.

Wednesday Group membership

Membership
The Republican Governance Group and its predecessors have never published its membership lists. Those who are known members are sourced below.

Leadership

Current members

Former members

See also
Blue Dog Coalition
Freedom Caucus
Liberty Caucus
Republican Study Committee
Tea Party Caucus
Rockefeller Republican
Young Turks

References 

1995 establishments in Washington, D.C.
Caucuses of the United States Congress
Centrist political advocacy groups in the United States
Conservative liberalism
Factions in the Republican Party (United States)
Ideological caucuses of the United States Congress
Political organizations based in the United States
Republican Party (United States) organizations
United States House of Representatives